Matt Feiler (born July 7, 1992) is an American football guard who is a free agent. He played college football at Bloomsburg (PA).

College career
Feiler played college football at Bloomsburg University. He began his freshman year in 2010 as an offensive guard and played in 11 games his first season with the Huskies. Before his sophomore season in 2012, he was moved to offensive tackle. Throughout his collegiate career, he started every game and also played in the 2014 East/West Shrine Game.

Professional career

Houston Texans

2014
Feiler went undrafted in the 2014 NFL Draft, but accepted an invitation to attend rookie minicamp with the Houston Texans on a tryout basis. On May 16, 2014, the Houston Texans signed Feiler to a three-year, $1.54 million contract that includes a signing bonus of $5,000. Throughout training camp, Feiler competed against Tyson Clabo, Anthony Dima, Bryan Witzmann, and Will Yeatman for a roster spot as a backup offensive tackle. On August 30, 2014, the Houston Texans waived Feiler as part of their final roster cuts, but subsequently signed him to their practice squad the following day. On December 31, 2014, the Houston Texans signed Feiler to a two-year, $1.11 million reserve/futures contract that included a signing bonus of $5,000.

2015
During training camp, Feiler competed for a roster spot as a backup offensive lineman against Bryan Witzmann, Will Yeatman, and Kendall Lamm.
On September 4, 2015, he was released by the Texans.

Pittsburgh Steelers
On September 7, 2015, Feiler was claimed off waivers by the Pittsburgh Steelers and signed to their practice squad.

2016
During training camp, Feiler competed for a roster spot as a backup offensive tackle against Ryan Harris and Jerald Hawkins. On September 3, 2016, Feiler was released by the Steelers as part of final roster cuts and was signed to the practice squad the next day. On October 8, 2016, he was promoted to the Steelers' active roster after Ryan Harris was placed on injured-reserve. On October 17, 2016, he was released by the Steelers and was re-signed back to the practice squad the next day. He signed a reserve/future contract with the Steelers on January 24, 2017.

2017
He entered training camp in  competing with Jerald Hawkins, Chris Hubbard, Brian Mihalik, Keavon Milton, and Jake Rodgers for a backup offensive tackle position. After losing the backup offensive tackle positions to Hawkins and Hubbard, Feiler was named the backup right guard to David DeCastro to begin the regular season. On September 24, 2017, Feiler made his professional regular season debut as the Steelers lost 23-17 at the Chicago Bears in Week 3. On December 31, 2017, Feiler earned his first career start during a 28-24 victory against the Cleveland Browns in Week 17. He played in five games and started one, his first NFL start, in Week 17 at right guard.

2018
On January 31, 2018, Feiler signed a one-year contract extension with the Steelers, who was due to become an exclusive-rights free agent. Feiler competed against B.J. Finney and Jerald Hawkins to be the primary backup offensive tackle after Chris Hubbard departed in free agency. He was named the primary backup tackle to begin the season. He made his first start of the season in Week 3 at right tackle in place of an injured Marcus Gilbert. He was named the starter at right tackle in Week 8, starting in nine of the final 10 games.

2019
On March 13, 2019, the Steelers traded Marcus Gilbert to the Arizona Cardinals, thereby creating a vacancy at the starting right tackle spot. Due to this turn of events, there was a training camp battle for the position between Feiler, Chukwuma Okorafor, Zach Banner, and Jerald Hawkins, which Feiler ultimately won. Feiler started all 16 games during the 2019 season.

2020
On March 18, 2020, the Steelers placed a second-round restricted free agent tender on Feiler. He signed the tender on June 12, 2020. He was named the Steelers starting left guard to begin the season. He started 13 games before suffering a pectoral injury in Week 14. He was placed on injured reserve on December 14, 2020. He was activated from injured reserve on January 9, 2021.

Los Angeles Chargers
On March 17, 2021, Feiler signed a three-year, $15 million contract with the Los Angeles Chargers. He was named the starting left guard, and started every game for two seasons.

On March 15, 2023, Feiler was released by the Chargers.

Personal life
Feiler was born in Strasburg, Pennsylvania to Mark and Beth Feiler. He attended Lampeter-Strasburg High School and played defensive tackle and offensive lineman throughout high school. He graduated in 2014 with a degree in history from Bloomsburg University.

Feiler married Julie Carpenter of Bloomsburg, PA on March 17, 2018.

References

External links
Bloomsburg Huskies bio

Living people
1992 births
American football offensive linemen
Bloomsburg Huskies football players
Players of American football from Pennsylvania
People from Strasburg, Pennsylvania
Los Angeles Chargers players
Pittsburgh Steelers players
Houston Texans players